Vandhaale Magaraasi is a 1973 Indian Tamil-language comedy film, directed by K. S. Gopalakrishnan and produced by Ashok Pictures. The screenplay was written by Gopalakrishnan, the film was shot at his own studio, Karpagam Studios. Music was by Shankar–Ganesh. The film stars Jayalalithaa (in dual role) and M. N. Rajam, playing lead role, with Jaishankar, V. S. Raghavan, Cho Ramaswamy Pushpalatha and Bhagavathy in supporting roles. It was released on 16 March 1973.

Plot 

Sundaram, a doctor by profession and an orphan comes to his village, to serve the villagers. He is stunned to see the inhuman behaviour meted out by his landlady Mangamma and her mother towards the other members of the house. The landlady's husband is Sivalingam, her brother and her mother-in-law. The widow's step-daughter Uma and her children undergo many miseries at their hands. To add to this, Lakshmi a simple village teacher, married the landlady Mangamma's brother. She was physically and mentally abused. Sundaram chances upon a look-like of Lakshmi, Rani and requests her to impersonate Lakshmi and teach Mangamma and her mother a lesson. Does Rani accept this proposal?

Cast 
 Jayalalithaa as Lakshmi/Rani
 Jaishankar as Dr. Sundaram
 M. N. Rajam as Mangamma
 Cho Ramaswamy as Lakshmi's Husband & Mangamma's Brother
 V. S. Raghavan as Sivalingam
Pushpalatha as Uma (Sivalingam Daughter)
 C. K. Saraswathi as Mangamma's Mother
S. N. Lakshmi as Lakshmi's Mother
T. K. Bhagavathi as Advocate Vaiyapuri (Rani's Father)
 V. R. Thilagam as Sengamalam
 K. Vijayan as Natesan (Uma Husband)
 V. Gopalakrishnan as Cameo Appearance
 Master Sridhar as Cameo Appearance
 Kallapart Natarajan as Saniyasamm
 S. R. Janaki as Sivalingam's  Mother
 K. D. Santhanam as Advocate

Soundtrack 
Music was composed by Shankar–Ganesh and lyrics were written by Vaali. Jayalalithaa sang "Kankalil Aayiram", rather than use a playback singer.

Release and reception 
Vandhaale Magaraasi was released on 16 March 1973. For her performance, Jayalalithaa won the Tamil Nadu Cinema Fan Award for Best Actress.

References

External links 
 
 

1970s satirical films
1970s Tamil-language films
1973 comedy-drama films
1973 films
Films about women in India
Films directed by K. S. Gopalakrishnan
Films scored by Shankar–Ganesh
Films with screenplays by K. S. Gopalakrishnan
Indian black-and-white films
Indian comedy-drama films
Indian feminist films
Indian satirical films